C. xanthostigma may refer to:

Chlorostoma xanthostigma, a sea snail species
Citharichthys xanthostigma, the longfin sanddab, a flatfish species